The Fate of the House of Habsburg is a 1928 German silent drama film directed by  and starring Fritz Spira, Alfons Fryland, and Leni Riefenstahl. It is based on the Mayerling incident of 1889, wherein a Crown Prince of Austria killed his mistress and himself.

The film's sets were designed by Artur Berger.

Cast

References

Bibliography

External links

1928 films
Films of the Weimar Republic
German silent feature films
1920s historical drama films
German historical drama films
Films set in Vienna
Films set in the 1880s
Films set in the 1890s
Films set in the 1900s
Films set in the 1910s
Biographical films about Austrian royalty
Films set in Austria
Cultural depictions of Empress Elisabeth of Austria
Cultural depictions of Franz Joseph I of Austria
Rudolf, Crown Prince of Austria
German black-and-white films
1928 drama films
Films set in the Austrian Empire
Silent historical drama films
1920s German films
1920s German-language films